Route 58 may refer to:

Route 58 (MTA Maryland), a bus route in Baltimore, Maryland and its suburbs
London Buses route 58

See also
List of highways numbered 58

58